Joanne Hadjia (born 7 November 1990 in Sydney) is an Australian singer best known simply as Joey Djia (formerly known as Joelle until 2016, NOWIMJOEY until 2017, JOEY until 2018) and for competing in the fourth season of The X Factor Australia as part of the duo Good Question and in the fifth season as a solo singer.

As of July 2016, Hadjia went under the name Joey. Her debut studio album is due in 2017, titled Enough.

Early life
Joanne Hadjia is from Sydney. She was a student at the University of Western Sydney.

Career
She originally tried to kickstart her career in LA when she was 19 and was signed to a small independent label. Hadjia released her first single entitled "Thought It Was You" which was produced by Sergio 'Don Dolla' Selim. Following the disbandment of Good Question, Hadjia announced that she would return to her solo career.

2012–2013: The X Factor Australia 
After Kristina Adesuwa discovered Hadjia on YouTube, they formed a duo called Good Question. The duo auditioned for the fourth season of The X Factor Australia, singing "Wild Ones" by American rapper Flo Rida and Sia, where they got four yeses. On the first day of super bootcamp, they performed "Back for Good" by the British pop group Take That. On 25 August 2012, Good Question performed "Get Yourself Back Home" by Gym Class Heroes on the talk show Weekend Sunrise.

Hadjia auditioned for the fifth season of The X Factor Australia as a solo artist, in her home town of Sydney, singing "Don't You Worry Child" by Swedish House Mafia. She gained two out of three yeses with judge Redfoo feeling the she didn't have "The X Factor", despite this she advanced to the super bootcamp stage of the competition. On the first day of super bootcamp, Hadjia sang a rendition of "I'm with You" by Avril Lavigne, advancing to the second stage of bootcamp. On the second day, she sang "ET" by Katy Perry. On the final day of bootcamp, Hadjia performed "Big Girls Don't Cry" by Fergie to the judges and a live audience of one thousand, advancing to the home visits. Hadjia was announced to compete in the Girls category being mentored by Redfoo. At the home visits, Hadjia sang "Read All About It, Pt. III" by Emeli Sande for Redfoo and his assistant will.i.am. Hadjia advanced to the live shows stage. At the first week of the live shows, Redfoo chose Hadjia to sing "Sweet Nothing" by Calvin Harris, and she advanced to the second week of the live shows.

In week four of the live shows, she sang "True Love" by Pink causing judge Ronan Keating to say "Every week, every single week we're in the same situation. This isn't you, this isn't the right song" and also leaving him to question Redfoo by saying "I don't know if you guys are not working together but I'm just not getting it. It's not happening." In week five of the live shows, Hadjia fell into the bottom two alongside Jiordan Tolli but was eliminated after Keating, Natalie Bassingthwaighte and Dannii Minogue all chose to save Tolli. Hadjia's version of "Joey" debuted on the ARIA Singles Chart at number 33, but fell to number 81 the following week.

Performances on The X Factor
 denotes having entered the ARIA Singles Chart. denotes having been in the bottom two. denotes having been eliminated.

2014: After The X Factor
Hadjia's debut single "Save Me" was released on 15 April 2014, and debuted at number 56 on the ARIA Singles Chart. In September 2014, Hadjia released a song called "So Don't" which was written by Hadjia and was recorded to raise awareness to suicide. Initially available only from her website, it was released on iTunes in March 2017. Hadjia's second single "Balance" was released on 19 November 2014. Hadjia's third single "Wish I Never" was released on 19 May 2015.

2012 - 2018:  Gronkeh to Djia Media, Inc 
In 2012, Joey decided to sign herself to a company of her own with the knowledge she gained being in the industry. Joey launched an independent label; Gronkeh, Inc. Gaining millions of listeners throughout the years, Joey decided to rebrand the company and to help other artists in the process. Djia Media, Inc. was developed from Joey's hard work and dedication. Being the CEO of her own career, Joey now helps usher a new generation of talent, signing new and also established acts. As of September 2019, Joey published her first book; "Decompress: A 7 Day Guide To Reduce Stress, Anxiety and Depression "  which became an international best seller in both Australia and America.

Artistry

Hadjia describes her voice as "a combination of RnB, pop and soul." Joelle also said "I don't really have a particular genre that I put myself in which I always thought was a bad thing but now I'm discovering it is good because it is something different and fresh". She cites Beyoncé, Drake, Rihanna, The Weeknd, Chris Brown, Lauryn Hill, Keri Hilson, Jessie J, John Legend, Rita Ora, Kelly Rowland, Ed Sheeran and Taylor Swift as her musical influences.

Discography

Studio albums

Singles

Other charted songs

References

External links 

Australian Internet celebrities
The X Factor (Australian TV series) contestants
Living people
Singers from Sydney
Western Sydney University alumni
1990 births
21st-century Australian singers
21st-century Australian women singers